Linear B was a syllabic script used for writing in Mycenaean Greek, the earliest attested form of Greek. The script predates the Greek alphabet by several centuries. The oldest Mycenaean writing dates to about 1400 BC. It is descended from the older Linear A, an undeciphered earlier script used for writing the Minoan language, as is the later Cypriot syllabary, which also recorded Greek. Linear B, found mainly in the palace archives at Knossos, Kydonia, Pylos, Thebes and Mycenae, disappeared with the fall of Mycenaean civilization during the Late Bronze Age collapse. The succeeding period, known as the Greek Dark Ages, provides no evidence of the use of writing.

Linear B was deciphered by English architect and self-taught linguist Michael Ventris based on the research of American classicist Alice Kober. It is the only Bronze Age Aegean script to have been deciphered, with Linear A, Cypro-Minoan, and Cretan hieroglyphic remaining unreadable.

Linear B consists of around 87 syllabic signs and over 100 ideographic signs. These ideograms or "signifying" signs symbolize objects or commodities. They have no phonetic value and are never used as word signs in writing a sentence.

The application of Linear B appears to have been confined to administrative contexts. In all the thousands of clay tablets, a relatively small number of different "hands" have been detected: 45 in Pylos (west coast of the Peloponnese, in southern Greece) and 66 in Knossos (Crete). Once the palaces were destroyed, the script disappeared.

Script
Linear B has roughly 200 signs, divided into syllabic signs as well as phonetic values and ideograms with semantic values. The representations and naming of these signs have been standardized by a series of international colloquia starting with the first in Paris in 1956. After the third meeting in 1961 at the Wingspread Conference Center in Racine, Wisconsin, a standard proposed primarily by Emmett L. Bennett, Jr., became known as the Wingspread Convention, which was adopted by a new organization, the Comité International Permanent des Études Mycéniennes (CIPEM), affiliated in 1970 by the fifth colloquium with UNESCO. Colloquia continue: the 13th occurred in 2010 in Paris.

Many of the signs are identical or similar to those in Linear A; however, Linear A encodes an as-yet unknown language, and it is uncertain whether similar signs had the same phonetic values.

Syllabic signs

The grid developed during decipherment by Michael Ventris and John Chadwick of phonetic values for syllabic signs is shown below. (Note that "q" represents the labialized velar stops , not the uvular stop of the IPA.)

Initial consonants are in the leftmost column; vowels are in the top row beneath the title. The transcription of the syllable, which may not have been pronounced that way, is listed next to the sign along with Bennett's identifying number for the sign preceded by an asterisk (as was Ventris' and Chadwick's convention). If the transcription of the sign remains uncertain, Bennett's number serves to identify the sign. The signs on the tablets and sealings often show considerable variation from each other and from the representations below. Discovery of the reasons for the variation and possible semantic differences is a topic of ongoing debate in Mycenaean studies.

Special and unknown signs 

In addition to the grid, the first edition of Documents in Mycenaean Greek contained a number of other signs termed "homophones" because they appeared at that time to resemble the sounds of other syllables and were transcribed accordingly: pa2 and pa3 were presumed homophonous to pa. Many of these were identified by the second edition and are shown in the "special values" below. The second edition relates: "It may be taken as axiomatic that there are no true homophones." The unconfirmed identifications of *34 and *35 as ai2 and ai3 were removed. pa2 became qa.

Other values remain unknown, mainly because of scarcity of evidence concerning them. Note that *34 and *35 are mirror images of each other, but whether this graphic relationship indicates a phonetic one remains unconfirmed.

In recent times, CIPEM inherited the former authority of Bennett and the Wingspread convention in deciding what signs are "confirmed" and how to officially represent the various sign categories. In editions of Mycenaean texts, the signs whose values have not been confirmed by CIPEM are always transcribed as numbers preceded by an asterisk (e.g., *64). CIPEM also allocates the numerical identifiers, and until such allocation, new signs (or obscured or mutilated signs) are transcribed as a bullet-point enclosed in square brackets: [•].

Spelling and pronunciation 

The signs are approximations since each may be used to represent a variety of about 70 distinct combinations of sounds within rules and conventions. The grid presents a system of monosyllabic signs of the type V/CV. Clarification of the 14 or so special values tested the limits of the grid model, but Chadwick eventually concluded that even with the ramifications, the syllabic signs can unexceptionally be considered monosyllabic.

 (Twe),  (two),  (dwe),  (dwo),  (nwa) and the more doubtful  (swi) and  (swa) may be regarded as beginning with labialized consonants, rather than two consonants, even though they may alternate with a two-sign form: o-da-twe-ta and o-da-tu-we-ta for Odatwenta; a-si-wi-jo and a-swi-jo for Aswios. Similarly,  (rya),  (ryo) and  (tya) begin with palatalized consonants rather than two consonants: -ti-ri-ja for -trja (-).

The one sign Chadwick tags as the exception to the monosyllabic rule is  (pte), but this he attributes to a development pte<*pje as in kleptei<*klep-jei.

Linear B does not consistently distinguish between voiced and unvoiced stop consonants (except in the dental series) and between aspirated and unaspirated stops even when these distinctions are phonemic in Mycenaean Greek. For example, pa-te is patēr, pa-si is phāsi; p on the other hand sometimes does not represent (like in the beginning of the following word)  ("basileus", meaning in this period "court official or local chieftain") is qa-si-re-u; ko-ru is korus ("helmet"), ka-ra-we is grāwes (plural of ), ko-no is skhoinos ("rope"). In other cases aspiration can be marked but is optional: pu-te for phutēr ("planter", from ), but phu-te-re for phutēres ("planters"). Initial aspiration may be marked only in the case of initial a and rarely: ha-te-ro for hateron (masculine ), and yet a-ni-ja for hāniai.

The w-series similarly are semivowels used word-initially and intervocalically after a syllable ending in u: ku-wa-no for kuanos ("blue").

The r-series includes both the /r/ and /l/ phonemes: ti-ri-po for tripos (i.e. ) and tu-ri-so for Tulisos.

The q-series is used for monosyllables beginning with a class of consonants that disappeared from classical Greek by regular phonetic change: the labialized velar consonants (see under Mycenaean Greek). These had entered the language from various sources: inheritance from Proto-Indo-European, assimilation, borrowing of foreign words, especially names. In Mycenaean they are /kʷ/, /gʷ/, and rarely /kʷh/ in names and a few words: a-pi-qo-ro for amphiquoloi; qo-u-ko-ro for guoukoloi ("cowherders"); -qo-i-ta for -.

Some consonants in some contexts are not written (but are understood to be present), such as word-initial s- and -w before a consonant, as in pe-ma for sperma ("seed"). The pe-, which was primarily used as its value pe of grid class CV, is here being used for sper-. This was not an innovative or exceptional use, but followed the stated rules. Syllable-final -l, -m, -n, -r and -s are also not written out, and only word-final velars are notated by plene writing: a-to-ro-qo for anthrōquos ("human being, person"). Here a, being primarily of grid class V, is being used as an- and could be used for al, am, ar, and so on.

In the case of clusters of two or three consonants that do not follow the initial s- and -w rule or the double consonants:  (ks or x),  (ps) and qus (which later did not exist in classical Greek), each consonant in the cluster is represented by a type CV sign that shares its consonant value: ko-no-so for Knōsos, or ku-ru-so for khrusos ("gold"). The vowels of these signs have been called "empty", "null", "extra", "dead" and other terms by various writers as they represent no sound. There were rules though, that governed the selection of the "empty" vowel and therefore determined which sign was to be used. The vowel had to be the same as the one of the first syllable following the cluster or, if at the end of the word, preceding: ti-ri-po with ti- (instead of ta-, te- and so on) to match -ri-.  A rare exception occurs in words formed from wa-na-ka, wanax (ϝάναξ, Homeric and Classical ἄναξ): wa-na-ka-te for wanaktei (dative), and wa-na-ka-te-ro for wanakteros, the adjectival form. This exception may not have applied to all contexts, as an example of wa-na-ka that follows standard rules has emerged in Ayios Vasileios in Laconia. The text reads wa-na-ko-to (genitive) and is written on a sealing nodule dating to the late 14th or early 13th century, slightly earlier than other Linear B texts found on mainland Greece.

Ideograms 

Linear B also uses a large number of ideograms. They express:
 the type of object concerned (e.g. a cow, wool, a spear),
 a unit of measure.

They have no phonetic value and are never used as word signs in writing a sentence, unlike Japanese kanji or Hittite cuneiform. Ideograms are typically at the end of a line before a number and appear to signify to which object the number applies. Many of the values remain unknown or disputed. Some commodities such as cloth and containers are divided into many different categories represented by distinct ideograms. Livestock may be marked with respect to sex.

The numerical references for the ideograms were originally devised by Ventris and Bennett and divided into functional groups corresponding to the breakdown of Bennett's index. The groups are numbered beginning 100, 110, 120 etc., with some provision of spare numbers for future additions; the official CIPEM numberings used today are based on Ventris and Bennett's numbering, with the provision that three or four letter codes (written in small capitals), based on Latin words that seemed relevant at the time, are used where the meanings are known and agreed. Unicode (as of version 5.0) encodes 123 Linear B ideograms.

The ideograms are symbols, not pictures of the objects in question; for example, one tablet records a tripod with missing legs, but the ideogram used is of a tripod with three legs. In modern transcriptions of Linear B tablets, it is typically convenient to represent an ideogram by its Latin or English name or by an abbreviation of the Latin name. Ventris and Chadwick generally used English; Bennett, Latin. Neither the English nor the Latin can be relied upon as an accurate name of the object; in fact, the identification of some of the more obscure objects is a matter of exegesis.

Archives

Corpus 
Inscriptions in Linear B have been found on tablets, stirrup jars and other objects; they are catalogued and classified by, inter alia, the location of the excavation they were found in.

Another 170 inscriptions in Linear B have been found on various vessels, for a total of some 6,058 known inscriptions.

For several decades scholars have worked to join tablet fragments together, thus making the tablets and their information more complete while reducing their numbers as a whole.

The oldest Linear B tablets are probably those from the Room of Chariot Tablets at Knossos, and date to the latter half of the 15th century BC. The Kafkania pebble, though from an earlier context, is not genuine. The earliest inscription from the mainland is an inscribed clay tablet found at Iklaina dating to between 1400 and 1350 BC.

An amber seal incised with Linear B signs was found in 2000 by amateur archaeologists at Bernstorf near Kranzberg, southern Germany, and is of much debated authenticity.

Chronology

Timeline of Bronze Age eastern Mediterranean scripts 
The Aegean is responsible for many of the early Greek language words that have to do with daily life such as words for tools and items that are seen every day. The sequence and the geographical spread of Cretan hieroglyphs, Linear A, and Linear B, the three overlapping, but distinct, writing systems on Bronze Age Crete, the Aegean islands, and mainland Greece are summarized as follows:

Timeline of Linear B
The main archives for Linear B are associated with these stages of Late Minoan and Helladic pottery:

Sixteen tablets found at the Megaron at Pylos are also thought to be dated to LHIIIA.

Controversy on the date of the Knossos tablets 
The Knossos archive was dated by Arthur Evans to the destruction by conflagration of about 1400 BC, which would have baked and preserved the clay tablets. He dated this event to the LM II period. This view stood until Carl Blegen excavated the site of ancient Pylos in 1939 and uncovered tablets inscribed in Linear B. They were fired in the conflagration that destroyed Pylos about 1200 BC, at the end of LHIIIB. With the decipherment of Linear B by Michael Ventris in 1952, serious questions about Evans's date began to be considered. Most notably, Blegen said that the inscribed stirrup jars, which are oil flasks with stirrup-shaped handles imported from Crete around 1200, were of the same type as those dated by Evans to the destruction of 1400. Blegen found a number of similarities between 1200 BC Pylos and 1400 BC Knossos and suggested the Knossian evidence be reexamined, as he was sure of the 1200 Pylian date.

The examination uncovered a number of difficulties. The Knossos tablets had been found at various locations in the palace. Evans had not kept exact records. Recourse was had to the day books of Evans's assistant, Duncan Mackenzie, who had conducted the day-to-day excavations. There were discrepancies between the notes in the day books and Evans's excavation reports. Moreover, the two men had disagreed over the location and strata of the tablets. The results of the reinvestigation were eventually published by Palmer and Boardman, On the Knossos Tablets. It contains two works, Leonard Robert Palmer's The Find-Places of the Knossos Tablets and John Boardman's The Date of the Knossos Tablets, representing Blegen's and Evans's views respectively. Consequently, the dispute was known for a time as "the Palmer–Boardman dispute". There has been no generally accepted resolution to it yet.

Contents 

The major cities and palaces used Linear B for records of disbursements of goods. Wool, sheep, and grain were some common items, often given to groups of religious people. A number of tablets also deal with military matters.

As is often the case with cuneiform tablets, when the buildings they were housed in were destroyed by fire many of the tablets were baked which preserved them.

Discovery and decipherment

Ancient Greece 
The Greeks of the historical era were unable to decipher Linear B, but its ideograms are sometimes mentioned by ancient authors. For example, Plutarch gives an account of the Spartan king Agesilaus II (r. 400–360 BC) sending a bronze tablet with "many letters marvellously old, for nothing could be made of them" to Egyptian priests in the hope they could understand them.

Arthur J. Evans's classification of scripts 
The British archaeologist Arthur Evans, keeper of the Ashmolean Museum, was presented by Greville Chester in 1886 with a sealstone from Crete engraved with a writing he took to be Mycenaean. Heinrich Schliemann had encountered signs similar to these, but had never identified the signs clearly as writing, relating in his major work on Mycenae that "of combinations of signs resembling inscriptions I have hitherto only found three or four ...." In 1893 Evans purchased more sealstones in Athens, verifying from the antiquarian dealers that the stones came from Crete. During the next year he noticed the script on other artefacts in the Ashmolean. In 1894 he embarked for Crete in search of the script. Soon after arrival, at Knossos he saw the sign of the double axe on an excavated wall, considering this the source of the script. Subsequently, he found more stones from the various ruins being worn by Cretan women as amulets called  "milk-stones", thought to encourage the production of breast milk.

Starting in 1894, Evans published his theories that the signs evidenced various phases in the development of a writing system in The Journal of Hellenic Studies, the first article being "Primitive Pictographs and a Prae-Phoenician Script from Crete". In these articles Evans distinguished between "pictographic writing" and "a linear system of writing". He did not explicitly define these terms, causing some confusion among subsequent writers concerning what he meant, but in 1898 he wrote "These linear forms indeed consist of simple geometrical figures which unlike the more complicated pictorial class were little susceptible to modification," and "That the linear or quasi-alphabetic signs ... were in the main ultimately derived from the rudely scratched line pictures belonging to the infancy of art can hardly be doubted."

Meanwhile, Evans began to negotiate for the land purchase of the Knossos site. He established the Cretan Exploration Fund, with only his own money at first, and by 1896 the fund had purchased one-fourth of Kephala Hill, on which the ruins were located, with first option to buy the rest. However, he could not obtain a firman excavation permit from the Ottoman government. He returned to Britain. In January 1897, the Christian population of Crete staged its final insurrection against the Ottoman Empire. The last Ottoman troops were ferried off the island by the British fleet on 5 December 1898. In that year also, Evans and his friends returned to complete purchase of the site. By this time, the Fund had other contributors as well. In 1899, the Constitution of a new Cretan Republic went into effect. Once Evans had received permission to excavate from the local authorities, excavation on the hill began on 23 March 1900.

According to Evans's report to the British School at Athens for that year, on 5 April, the excavators discovered the first large cache ever of Linear B tablets among the remains of a wooden box in a disused terracotta bathtub. Subsequently, caches turned up at multiple locations, including the Room of the Chariot Tablets, where over 350 pieces from four boxes were found. Even in this earliest excavation report, Evans could tell that "a certain number of quasi-pictorial characters also occur which seem to have an ideographic or determinative meaning."

The excavation was over for that year by 2 June. Evans reported: "only a comparatively small proportion of the tablets were preserved in their entirety," the causes of destruction being rainfall through the roof of the storage room, crumbling of small pieces, and being thrown away by workmen who failed to identify them. A report on 6 September to the Royal Anthropological Institute of Great Britain and Ireland began to use some of the concepts characteristic of Evans's later thought: "palace of Knossos" and "palace of Minos". Appletons' Cyclopædia of American Biography, 1900, notes that Evans took up Stillman's theme that the palace was the labyrinth of mythology in which the half-bovine son of King Minos lurked. In the report, the tablets are now called a "linear script" as opposed to the "hieroglyphic or conventionalized pictographic script". The linear script has characters that are "of a free, upright, European character" and "seem to have been for the most part syllabic". Evans reasserts the ideographic idea: "a certain number are unquestionably ideographic or determinative."

The years after 1900 were consumed by excavations at Knossos and the discovery and study by Evans of tablets, with a projected comprehensive work on Cretan scripts to be called Scripta Minoa. A year before the publication of volume I, he began to drop hints that he now believed the linear script was two scripts, to be presented in the forthcoming book.

In Scripta Minoa I, which appeared in 1909, he explained that the discovery of the Phaistos Disc in July 1908 had caused him to pull the book from the presses so that he could include the disk by permission, as it had not yet been published. On the next page he mentioned that he was also including by permission of Federico Halbherr of the Italian Mission in Crete unpublished tablets from Hagia Triada written in a linear script of "Class A". To what degree if any Halbherr was responsible for Evans's division of the "linear script" into "Class A" and "Class B" is not stated. The Knossos tablets were of Class B, so that Evans could have perceived Class A only in tablets from elsewhere, and so recently that he needed permission to include the examples.

Evans summarized the differences between the two scripts as "type" or "form of script;' that is, varieties in the formation and arrangement of the characters. For example, he says "the clay documents belonging to Class A show a certain approximation in their forms to those presenting the hieroglyphic inscriptions ... the system of numerals is also in some respects intermediate between that of the hieroglyphic documents and that of the linear Class B."

The first volume covered "the Hieroglyphic and Primitive Linear Classes" in three parts: the "pre-Phoenician Scripts of Crete", the "Pictorial Script" and "the Phaistos Disk". One or two more volumes publishing the Linear A and Linear B tablets were planned, but Evans ran out of time; the project required more than one man could bring to it. For a good many of the years left to him, he was deeply enmeshed in war and politics in the Balkans. When he did return to Knossos, completion and publication of the palace excavations took priority. His greatest work, Palace of Minos, came out in 1935. It did include scattered descriptions of tablets. He died in 1941, soon after Nazi forces invaded Crete.

The Knossos tablets had remained in the museum at Irakleion, Crete, where many of them now were missing. The unpublished second volume consisted of notes by Evans and plates and fonts created by Clarendon Press. In 1939, Carl Blegen had uncovered the Pylos Tablets; pressure was mounting to finish Scripta Minoa II. After Evans's death, Alice Kober, assistant to John Myres and a major transcriber of the Knossos tablets, prompted Myres to come back from retirement and finish the work. Emmett L. Bennett, Jr. added more transcriptions. The second volume came out in 1952 with Evans cited as author and Myres as editor, just before the discovery that Linear B writes an early form of Greek. An impatient Ventris and Chadwick declared: "Two generations of scholars had been cheated of the opportunity to work constructively on the problem."

Early attempts

Despite the limited source materials, during this time there were efforts to decipher the newly discovered Cretan script. Australian classicist Florence Stawell published an interpretation of the Phaistos Disc in the April 1911 issue of The Burlington Magazine. She followed this with the book A Clue to the Cretan Scripts, published in 1931. Stawell declared all three Cretan script forms to represent early Homeric Greek, and offered her attempts at translations. Also in 1931, F. G. Gordon's Through Basque to Minoan was published by the Oxford University Press. Gordon attempted to prove a close link between the Basque language and Linear B, without lasting success.

In 1949, Bedřich Hrozný published Les Inscriptions Crétoises, Essai de déchiffrement, a proposed decipherment of the Cretan scripts. Hrozny was internationally renowned as the translator of Hittite cuneiform decades previously. His Minoan translations into academic French, though, proved to be considerably subjective, and incorrect.

From the 1930s to 1950s there was correspondence between, and papers published by, various international academic figures. These included Johannes Sundwall, K. D. Ktistopoulos, Ernst Sittig and V. I. Georgiev. None of them succeeded with decipherment, yet they added to knowledge and debate.

Alice Kober's triplets 

About the same time, Alice Kober studied Linear B and managed to construct grids, linking similar symbols in groups of threes. Kober noticed that a number of Linear B words had common roots and suffixes. This led her to believe that Linear B represented an inflected language, with nouns changing their endings depending on their case. However, some characters in the middle of the words seemed to correspond with neither a root nor a suffix. Because this effect was found in other known languages, Kober surmised that the odd characters were bridging syllables, with the beginning of the syllable belonging to the root and the end belonging to the suffix. This was a reasonable assumption, since Linear B had far too many characters to be considered alphabetic and too few to be logographic; therefore, each character should represent a syllable. Kober's systematic approach allowed her to demonstrate the existence of three grammatical cases and identify several pairs of signs that shared vowels or consonants with one another.

Kober also showed that the two-symbol word for 'total' at the end of livestock and personnel lists, had a different symbol for gender. This gender change with one letter, usually a vowel, is most frequent in Indo-European languages. Kober had rejected any speculation on the language represented, preferring painstaking cataloguing and analysis of the actual symbols, though she did believe it likely that Linear A and Linear B represented different languages.

Emmett L. Bennett's transcription conventions 

The convention for numbering the symbols still in use today was first devised by Emmett L. Bennett Jr. Working alongside fellow academic Alice Kober, by 1950 Bennett had deciphered the metrical system, based on his intensive study of Linear B tablets unearthed at Pylos. He concluded that those tablets contained exactly the same script as the Linear B found at Knossos, and he classified and assigned identification numbers to the Linear B signs as he prepared a publication on the Pylos tablets. Like Kober, Bennett was also an early proponent of the idea that Linear A and B represented different languages. His book The Pylos Tablets became a crucial resource for Michael Ventris, who later described it as "a wonderful piece of work".

Michael Ventris' identification as Greek 

In 1935, the British School at Athens was celebrating its fiftieth anniversary with an exhibition at Burlington House, London. Among the speakers was Arthur Evans, then eighty-four years old. A teenage Michael Ventris was present in the audience. In 1940, the 18-year-old Ventris had an article Introducing the Minoan Language published in the American Journal of Archaeology.

After wartime service as a navigator with RAF Bomber Command, and a post-war year in Occupied Germany, he returned to civilian life, and completed qualification as an architect. Despite having no university qualification, Ventris continued with his amateur interest in Linear B, corresponding with known scholars, who usually but not always replied.

Michael Ventris and John Chadwick performed the bulk of the decipherment of Linear B between 1951 and 1953. At first Ventris chose his own numbering method, but later switched to Bennett's system. His initial decipherment was achieved using Kober's classification tables, to which he applied his own theories. Some Linear B tablets had been discovered on the Greek mainland. Noticing that certain symbol combinations appeared only on the tablets found in Crete, he conjectured that these might be names of places on the island. This proved to be correct. Working with the symbols he could decipher from this, Ventris soon unlocked much text and determined that the underlying language of Linear B was in fact Greek. This contradicted general scientific views of the time, and indeed Ventris himself had previously agreed with Evans's hypothesis that Linear B was not Greek.

Ventris' discovery was of significance in demonstrating a Greek-speaking Minoan-Mycenaean culture on Crete, and thus presenting Greek in writing centuries earlier than had been previously accepted.

Chadwick, a university lecturer in Ancient Greek philology, helped Ventris develop his decipherment of the text and discover the vocabulary and grammar of Mycenaean Greek. He noted:
That any Linear B tablets are written in a language other than Greek still remains to be demonstrated; but that words and usages not exactly paralleled in later Greek occur is both certain and to be expected. But we must not resort to "non-Greek" whenever we come up against an insoluble problem.
The first edition of their book, Documents in Mycenaean Greek, was published in 1956, shortly after Ventris's death in an automobile accident. The Ventris decipherment did not immediately meet with universal approval.

Unicode 

Linear B was added to the Unicode Standard in April, 2003 with the release of version 4.0.

The Linear B Syllabary block is U+10000–U+1007F.
The Linear B Ideograms block is U+10080–U+100FF.
The Unicode block for the related Aegean Numbers is U+10100–U+1013F.

A variety of fonts encode Linear B.

See also 

Aegean civilizations
Aegean numerals
Cypriot syllabary
Cypro-Minoan syllabary
Linear A
Proto-Greek language
The Riddle of the Labyrinth, a 2013 popular book detailing the decipherment of Linear B

Notes

References

Citations

Sources 

 Carpenter, Rhys (1957). "Linear B", Phoenix, Vol. 11, No. 2 (Summer, 1957), pp. 47–62.
 
 
  has the Enkomi clay tablet, circa 1500 BCE., examples of Linear B tablets, and translated, the basic Linear B syllabary, the Cypriot syllabary and discussions thereof, and short sections on Linear A, and the Phaistos Disk.
 
  
 
 
  T.G. Palaima, "Contiguities' in the Linear B Tablets from Pylos", in E. de Miro, L. Godart, A. Sacconi eds., Atti e memorie del secondo congresso interazionale di micenologia (Rome 1996) pp. 379–396, 1996
 Palaima, Thomas G., "Unlocking the Secrets of Ancient Writing: The Parallel Lives of Michael Ventris and Linda Schele and the Decipherment of Mycenaean and Mayan Writing", University of Texas at Austin, Eleventh International Mycenological Colloquium, 2000.
   Chapter 6, Linear B, pp. 108–119: discusses Arthur Evans, his work, the Cypriot clues, the syllabary, Alice Kober, the "Grid", and a sample tablet transliterated, and translated into English.
 Robinson, Andrew The Man Who Deciphered Linear B: the story of Michael Ventris (2002)  Thames & Hudson   
  for a general outline of the Linear B deciphering story, from Schliemann to Chadwick.
 
 
 Ventris, Michael; Chadwick, John (1953) "Evidence for Greek Dialect in the Mycenaean Archives", The Journal of Hellenic Studies, Vol. 73, (1953), pp. 84–103.

Further reading

 Bakker, Egbert J., ed. 2010. A companion to the Ancient Greek language. Oxford: Wiley-Blackwell.  
 Chadwick, John (1958). The decipherment of Linear B. Cambridge, UK: Cambridge University Press.
 Christidis, Anastasios-Phoivos, ed. 2007. A history of Ancient Greek: From the beginnings to Late Antiquity. Cambridge, UK: Cambridge University Press.  
 Colvin, Stephen C. 2007. A historical Greek reader: Mycenaean to the koiné. Oxford: Oxford University Press.  
 Fox, Margalit. "The Riddle of the Labyrinth".  HarperCollins Publishers Inc. New York, NY.
 Freo, M. D., Nosch, M.-L., & Rougemont, F. (2010). "The Terminology of Textiles in the Linear B Tablets, including Some Considerations on Linear A Logograms and Abbreviations". In: C. Michel & M.-L. Nosch (Eds.). Textile Terminologies in the Ancient Near East and Mediterranean from the Third to the First Millennnia BC (Vol. 8). Oxbow Books. pp. 338–373. http://www.jstor.org/stable/j.ctt1cfr985.21
 Godart, L., & Andreadaki-Vlazaki, M. (2022). A new Linear B tablet from Khania: KH X 8. A new Linear B tablet from Khania: KH X 8., pp. 37–42
 Hooker, J. T. 1980. Linear B: An introduction. Bristol, UK: Bristol Classical Press.
 Horrocks, Geoffrey. 2010. Greek: A history of the language and its speakers. 2nd ed. Oxford: Wiley-Blackwell.  
 Judson, Anna P. 2020. "The Undeciphered Signs of Linear B: Interpretation and Scribal Practices". Cambridge: Cambridge University Press.  
  Judson, Anna P.,  "Learning to spell in Linear B: orthography and scribal training in Mycenaean Pylos." The Cambridge Classical Journal, 1-31, 2022
 Morpurgo Davies, Anna, and Yves Duhoux, eds. 1985. Linear B: A 1984 survey. Louvain, Belgium: Peeters.
 ––––. 2008. A companion to Linear B: Mycenaean Greek texts and their world. Vol. 1. Louvain, Belgium: Peeters.
 OWENS, GARETH. "WAS SE-TO-I-JA AT ARCHANES?" , KADMOS, vol. 33, no. 1, 1994, pp. 22–28
 Palaima, Thomas G. 1988. "The development of the Mycenaean writing system". In Texts, tablets and scribes. Edited by J. P. Olivier and T. G. Palaima, 269–342. Suplementos a "Minos" 10. Salamanca, Spain: Consejo Superior de Investigaciones Científicas.
 Palmer, Leonard R. 1980. The Greek language. London: Faber & Faber. .
E. Salgarella, "Aegean Linear Script(s). Rethinking the Relationship Between Linear A and Linear", Cambridge: Cambridge University Press, 2020. 
 Srivatsan, Nikita, et al. "Neural Representation Learning for Scribal Hands of Linear B." International Conference on Document Analysis and Recognition. Springer, Cham, 2021
Ventris, Michael, and John Chadwick. 1973. Documents in Mycenaean Greek. 2nd ed. Cambridge, UK: Cambridge University Press. 
Young, Douglas, "Is Linear B Deciphered?", Arion: A Journal of Humanities and the Classics, vol. 4, no. 3, pp. 512–42, 1965

External links

 Minoan Language Linear A Linked to Linear B in Groundbreaking Research - Greek Reporter - April 20, 2022
 
 
 

 
 Linear B online transliterator
 Linear B Explorer
 
 Palaeolexicon – 
 
 
 The Prehistoric Archaeology of the Aegean - The Foundation of the Hellenic World at Dartmouth College
 

Mycenaean Greek
Clay tablets
Hellenic scripts
Syllabary writing systems
Bronze Age writing systems
Aegean languages in the Bronze Age
Mycenaean Crete
1900 archaeological discoveries
Obsolete writing systems
History of the Greek language